Jon Spinogatti is an American television and film actor. Spinogatti had roles in The Wolf of Wall Street, Numb3rs, Desperate Housewives, Strong Medicine, Over There, Gilmore Girls, and ER.

Filmography

References

External links 

Living people
American male film actors
21st-century American male actors
American male television actors
American male soap opera actors
Year of birth missing (living people)
Place of birth missing (living people)